Masks among Eskimo peoples served a variety of functions. Masks were made out of driftwood, animal skins, bones and feathers. They were often painted using bright colors. There are archeological miniature maskettes made of walrus ivory, dating from early Paleo-Eskimo and from early Dorset culture period.

Despite some similarities in the cultures of the Eskimo peoples, their cultural diversity makes it hard to generalize how different groups, like the Inuit and Yupik used masks. The sustenance, Inuit religion, soul concepts, even the language of the different communities were often very different.

Eskimo groups comprise a huge area stretching from Siberia through Alaska and Northern Canada (including Nunatsiavut in Labrador and Nunavik in Quebec) to  Greenland. The term Eskimo has fallen out of favor in Canada and Greenland, where it is considered pejorative and the term Inuit has become more common. However, Eskimo is still considered acceptable among Alaska Natives of Yupik and Iñupiat (Inuit) heritage, as well as Siberian Yupik peoples, and is preferred over Inuit as a collective reference.

Early masks 
Archaeological masks have been found from early Paleo-Eskimo and from early Dorset culture period. It is believed that these masks served several functions, including being in rituals representing animals in personalized form; being used by shaman (medicine man or angakkuq) in ceremonies relating to spirits (as in the case of a wooden mask from southwestern Alaska); it is also suggested that they could be worn during song contest ceremonials.

Associated beliefs 

Although beliefs about unity between human and animal did not extend to that of absolute interchangeability, several Eskimo peoples had sophisticated soul concepts (including variants of soul dualism) that linked living humans, their ancestors, and their prey. Besides synchronous beliefs, there were also notions of unity between human and animal, and myths about an ancient time when the animal could take on human form at will. Traditional transformation masks reflected this unity. Ritual ceremonies could enable the community to enact these stories with the help of masks, sometimes with the masked person representing the animal.

Yup'ik masks 

The Yup'ik are Eskimos of western Alaska whose masks vary enormously but are characterised by great invention. Yup'ik masks differ in size from forehead and finger 'maskettes', to enormous constructions that dancers need external supports to perform with. Many of these masks were used almost as stage props, some of which imbued the dancer with the spirit that they represented - and most were often destroyed after use. Others represented animal people, (yuit), and insects, berries, plants, ice and objects of everyday life.

See also 
 Inuit art

References

Further reading 
  The tale title means: "The way life appeared"; the book title means: "Eskimo tales"; the series means: "The tales of world literature".
 
 
 
 
 
 
 
  Hungarian translation of Rasmussen 1926.
 
  Translation of the original:

External links

Eskimo
Eskimos
Inuit culture
Inuit art
Inuit shamanism
Indigenous woodcarving of the Americas
Masks in the Americas